The 1987 Troy State Trojans football team represented Troy State University during the 1987 NCAA Division II football season, and completed the 67th season of Trojans football. The Trojans played their home games in at Veterans Memorial Stadium in Troy, Alabama. The 1987 team came off a 10–3 record from the previous season. The 1987 team was led by coach Rick Rhoades. The team finished the regular season with a 9–1–1 record and made the NCAA Division II playoffs. The Trojans defeated the  31–17 in the National Championship Game en route to the program's second NCAA Division II Football Championship and third overall national championship.

Schedule

References

Troy State
Troy Trojans football seasons
NCAA Division II Football Champions
Gulf South Conference football champion seasons
Troy State Trojans football